Talaf is a village in northwestern Syria, administratively part of the Hama Governorate, located southwest of Hama. Nearby localities include Musa al-Houla to the north, Hirbnafsah to the northeast, Kisin to the east, Burj Qa'i to the south, Taldou to the southwest and Kafr Laha and Tell Dahab to the west. According to the Syria Central Bureau of Statistics, Talaf had a population of 4,934 in the 2004 census. Its inhabitants are predominantly Sunni Muslims of Turkmen descent.

References

Bibliography

 

Populated places in Hama District
Turkmen communities in Syria